Mid-term parliamentary elections were held in Costa Rica on 8 February 1942. The ruling Independent National Republican Party, led by President Rafael Ángel Calderón Guardia presented candidates throughout the country. The Workers and Farmers Party, which had been a staunch opponent of Calderon at the time, fielded candidates in every province except rural Guanacaste. In addition, the Cortesista Party of León Cortés Castro ran in Alajuela and the Democratic Party (also close to former President Cortés) in San José.

The results were a resounding success for the Independent National Republican Party, which won a large majority. However, the elections were heavily criticised and were accused of involving fraudulent behaviour by most other parties.

Results

References

Costa Rica
1942 in Costa Rica
Elections in Costa Rica
Election and referendum articles with incomplete results